See also:
1960 in comics,
other events of 1961,
1962 in comics,
1960s in comics and the
list of years in comics

Publications

Year overall
National Periodical Publications was publicly traded on the stock puffs

January
January 5: in Spirou, first chapter of Les rivaux de Painful Gulch, by Goscinny and Morris. 
January 15 : Donald's Odyssey, by Guido Martina and Pier Lorenzo De Vita, a parody of the Odyssey, with Donald Duck as Odysseus, is first prepublished in Topolino.
January 21: in Le parisien liberè, first chapter of Les Dalton sur le sentier de guerre, by Goscinny and Morris.
January 25: The first issue of the British comics magazine The Victor is published. It will run until 21 November 1992.
Gunsmoke Western (1955 series) #62 - Marvel Comics
Journey into Mystery (1952 series) #64 - Marvel Comics
Kid Colt Outlaw (1948 series) #96 - Marvel Comics
Spy vs. Spy by Antonio Prohías debuts in Mad Magazine.
Strange Tales (1951 series) #80 - Marvel Comics
Tales of Suspense (1959 series) #13 - Marvel Comics
Tales to Astonish (1959 series) #15 - Marvel Comics
Western Comics (1948 series), with issue #85 (January/February cover date) canceled by DC 
 Editoriale Dardo publishes the first issue of the Italian series Falco Bianco (White Hawk), by Onofrio Bramante, set in Canada during the French and Indian Wars.

February
February 12: In Topolino, The secret of success, by Romano Scarpa is first prepublished, which marks the debut of Jubal Pomp.
February 18: The British comics magazine Radio Fun ends its run and merges with Buster.
February 25: Bert Felstead's Leo the Friendly Lion debuts.
February 26: Topolino imperatore della Calidornia (Mickey, Calisota’s imperator), by Romano Scarpa in Topolino. 
Journey into Mystery (1952 series) #65 - Marvel Comics
Rawhide Kid (1955 series) #20 - Marvel Comics
Strange Tales (1951 series) #81 - Marvel Comics
Tales of Suspense (1959 series) #14 - Marvel Comics
Tales to Astonish (1959 series) #16 - Marvel Comics
Two-Gun Kid (1948 series) #58 - Marvel Comics

March
 March 6: In Charles M. Schulz's Peanuts Frieda makes her debut.
 March 18: The first issue of the British comics magazine Bimbo is published. It will run until 22 January 1972. In the first issue Bob Dewar's Bimbo makes its debut. 
Journey into Mystery (1952 series) #66 - Marvel Comics
Kid Colt Outlaw (1948 series) #97 - Marvel Comics
Strange Tales (1951 series) #82 - Marvel Comics
Tales of Suspense (1959 series) #15 - Marvel Comics
Tales to Astonish (1959 series) #17 - Marvel Comics

April
 April 1: Eric Roberts' Winker Watson debuts in the British comics magazine The Dandy. 
April 2: The first issue of the Italian Western series Dick Cheyenne, by Renzo Barbieri and Edgardo Dall’Acqua by Editoriale Dardo is published.
April 28: The first issue of Radar, by Tristano Torelli and Franco Donatelli is published, a rare example of a super-hero comcis by Italian authors.
 Adventure Comics #283 - DC Comics. It features the debut of General Zod. 
 Batman #139 - DC Comics. It features the debut of Betty Kane who takes on the persona of Batgirl. 
Journey into Mystery (1952 series) #67 - Marvel Comics
Rawhide Kid (1955 series) #21 - Marvel Comics
Strange Tales (1951 series) #83 - Marvel Comics
Tales of Suspense (1959 series) #16 - Marvel Comics
Tales to Astonish (1959 series) #18 - Marvel Comics
Two-Gun Kid (1948 series) #59 - Marvel Comics

May
 May 11: Maurice Rosy's and Paul Deliège's Bobo makes its debut in a mini–récit (mini-story) in Spirou magazine. 
May 18: The first episode of Asterix and the Goths by Goscinny and Uderzo is prepublished in Pilote.
Journey into Mystery (1952 series) #68 - Marvel Comics
Kid Colt Outlaw (1948 series) #98 - Marvel Comics
Strange Tales (1951 series) #84 - Marvel Comics
Tales of Suspense (1959 series) #17 - Marvel Comics
Tales to Astonish (1959 series) #19 - Marvel Comics

June
June 15: Sergio Bonelli and Gallieno Ferri's Zagor makes its debut with the story The forest of ambushes.
June 18: Paperino e il calumet della pace (Donald and the ceremonial pipe), by Luciano Bottaro is prepublished in Topolino. It marks the comeback of Joe Piper, twenty years after his creation by Floyd Gottfredson.
June 22: The first episode of the Lucky Luke story Billy the Kid  by René Goscinny and Morris is prepublished in Spirou.  
Amazing Adventures (1961 series) #1 - Marvel Comics
Journey into Mystery (1952 series) #69 - Marvel Comics
Rawhide Kid (1955 series) #22 - Marvel Comics
Strange Tales (1951 series) #85 - Marvel Comics
Tales of Suspense (1959 series) #18 - Marvel Comics
Tales to Astonish (1959 series) #20 - Marvel Comics

July
 July 1: The first episode of the Dutch funny animal comic Wipperoen (Whipper in English) by Raymond Bär von Hemmersweil and Jan van Reek is published. The series will run until 1974.
July 4: In Tintin magazine the first episodes of the Adventures of Tintin story The Castafiore Emerald, by Hergé and of La trahison de Steve Warson, by Jean Graton.are prepublished.
All-Star Western (vol. 1), with issue #119, canceled by DC
Amazing Adventures (1961 series) #2 - Marvel Comics
Journey into Mystery (1952 series) #70 - Marvel Comics
Kid Colt Outlaw (1948 series) #99 - Marvel Comics
Strange Tales (1951 series) #86 - Marvel Comics
Tales of Suspense (1959 series) #19 - Marvel Comics
Tales to Astonish (1959 series) #21 - Marvel Comics
 First issue of Geppo (Bianconi)

August
Amazing Adventures (1961 series) #3 - Marvel Comics
Dell Giant # 48
First appearance in comics of The Flintstones. In the year, they get too a syndicated strip (October) and a magazine named after them (December).
Fantastic Four (1961 series) #1 - Marvel Comics
First appearance of the Fantastic Four (Mister Fantastic, Invisible Woman, Human Torch and the Thing)
Journey into Mystery (1952 series) #71 - Marvel Comics
Rawhide Kid (1955 series) #23 - Marvel Comics
Strange Tales (1951 series) #87 - Marvel Comics
Tales of Suspense (1959 series) #20 - Marvel Comics
Tales to Astonish (1959 series) #22 - Marvel Comics

September
 September 25: The first episode of Harry Mace's Amy comic strip is published. It will run until 1991.
Amazing Adventures (1961 series) #4 — Marvel Comics
 Fantastic Four (1961 series) #2 — Marvel Comics
The Flash #123 — DC Comics; the "Flash of Two Worlds" story introduces Earth-Two, and more generally the concept of the multiverse, to DC Comics.
 Help! #12 — Warren Publishing; the final issue of vol. 1
Journey into Mystery (1952 series) #72 — Marvel Comics
Kid Colt Outlaw (1948 series) #100 — Marvel Comics
Strange Tales (1951 series) #88 — Marvel Comics
Tales of Suspense (1959 series) #21 — Marvel Comics
Tales to Astonish (1959 series) #23 — Marvel Comics
 Uncle Scrooge (1953 series) #35 — Dell; featuring "Gift Lion" by Carl Barks

October
 October 16: Mort Walker and Jerry Dumas' Sam's Strip makes its debut. It will run until 1963.
Amazing Adventures (1961 series) #5 - Marvel Comics
Journey into Mystery (1952 series) #73 - Marvel Comics
The Lighter Side of... by Dave Berg debuts in Mad Magazine.
Rawhide Kid (1955 series) #24 - Marvel Comics
Showcase #34 - DC Comics. It features the debut of Gardner Fox', Gil Kane's and Murphy Anderson's Atom.
Strange Tales (1951 series) #89 - Marvel Comics
Tales of Suspense (1959 series) #22 - Marvel Comics
Tales to Astonish (1959 series) #24 - Marvel Comics.
Asterix le gaulois, first album of the Asterix series.

November
 November 19: In Charles M. Schulz' Peanuts Little Red-Haired Girl makes her debut.
November 22: The Lucky Luke adventure  Les collines noires by Goscinny and Morris is prepublished in Spirou. 
Amazing Adventures (1961 series) #6 - Marvel Comics
Journey into Mystery (1952 series) #74 - Marvel Comics
Kid Colt Outlaw (1948 series) #101 - Marvel Comics
Strange Tales (1951 series) #90 - Marvel Comics
Tales of Suspense (1959 series) #23 - Marvel Comics
Tales to Astonish (1959 series) #25 - Marvel Comics

December
 In the Uncle Scrooge story The Midas Touch by Carl Barks the evil sorceress Magica De Spell and the Scrooge's secretary Miss Typefast make their debut. The same month billionaire John D. Rockerduck makes his debut too, in the story Boat Buster.
Action Comics #283 - DC Comics
Adventure Comics #291 - DC Comics
Adventures into the Unknown #129 (December 1961-January 1962) - American Comics Group
Adventures of Bob Hope #72 (December 1961-January 1962) - DC Comics
Amazing Adult Fantasy (1961 series) #7 renamed from Amazing Adventures - Marvel Comics
Journey into Mystery (1952 series) #75 - Marvel Comics
Rawhide Kid (1955 series) #25 - Marvel Comics
Strange Tales (1951 series) #91 - Marvel Comics
Tales of Suspense (1959 series) #24 - Marvel Comics
Tales to Astonish (1959 series) #26 - Marvel Comics

Specific date unknown
 The final episode of William McCleery and Ralph Fuller's Oaky Doaks is published.

Births

Specific date unknown
 Si Spencer, British TV writer and comics writer (Harke & Burr, The Creep, wrote for Judge Dredd), (d. 2021).

Deaths

January
 January 10: Dashiel Hammett, American detective novelist and scriptwriter (Secret Agent X-9), passes away at age 66.

February
 February 11: Kate Carew, American caricaturist and comics artist (The Angel Child), dies at age 91.
 February 27: Nate Collier, American animator, illustrator and comics artist (Our Own Movies, Kelly Kids, Can It Be Done?, The Professor), dies at age 77.

April
 April 1: William Sharp, Austrian-American comic artist (made newspaper comic adaptations of novels), dies at age 60.

May
 Specific date unknown: Art Krenz, American writer and sports cartoonist, dies at age 55 or 56.

June
 June 2: Chéri Hérouard, French illustrator and comics artist (drew comics for La Semaine de Suzette and La Vie Parisienne), dies at age 80.
 June 30: Félix Jobbe-Duval, French illustrator and comics artist, dies at age 82.

July
 July 20: Wilson McCoy, American comics artist (continued The Phantom), dies at age 59.

August
 August 9: Joseph Hémard, French illustrator and comics artist, dies at age 81.

September
 September 20: Nándor Honti, aka Bit, Hungarian painter, illustrator and comics artist (Nagyapó Mozgószínháza, Tréfás Természetrajz, Séta Álomországban), dies at age 83.
 Specific date in September unknown: Julius Stafford Baker (Sr.), British comics artist (Casey's Court, Tiger Tim), dies at age 91 or 92.

December
 December 6: Ralph O. Yardley, American comics artist (Have You Seen Alonzo?, Do You Remember?), dies at age 83.
 December 24: Charles Hamilton, aka Frank Richards, British novelist and comics writer (Billy Bunter), passes away at age 85.
 December 31: Péricles, Brazilian comics artist (O Amigo da Onça), commits suicide at age 37.

Specific date unknown
 Bernard Dibble, American comics artist (Danny Dingle, Looy Dot Dope, assisted on Hawkshaw the Detective, continued The Captain and the Kids, Cynical Susie, Fritzi Ritz, worked for Quality Comics), dies at age 61 or 62.
 Max A. Otto, German comics artist (Stups), dies at age 61.
 Raúl Roux, Uruguayan-Argentine comics artist (Rulito, el Gato Atorrante, Hombres qua han Conquistado Fama, Fiero a Fierro, Cuentos de Fogón, Lanza Seca), dies at age 59.

Initial appearances by character name

DC Comics 
Hawkman (Carter Hall) in Brave and Bold #37 (March)
Hawkwoman in Brave and Bold #37 (March)
Kobra (DC Comics) in Batman #139 (April)
Bette Kane in Batman #139 (April)
General Zod in Adventure Comics #283 (April)
Sinestro in Green Lantern #07 (August)
Atom (Ray Palmer) in Showcase #34 (October)
Jean Loring in Showcase #34 (October)
Matt Hagen in Detective Comics #298 (December)
Pete Ross in Superboy #86 (January)
Haunted Tank in G.I. Combat #87 (May)
Sue Dibny in The Flash #119 (March)
Brainiac 5 in Action Comics #276 (May)
Tomar-Re in Green Lantern #06 (May)
Doctor Destiny in Justice League of America #05 (June)
Mon-El in Superboy #89 (June)
Thom Kallor in Action Comics #282 (March)
Hector Hammond in Green Lantern #05 (April)
Top (comics) in The Flash #122 (August)
Luornu Durgo in Action Comics #276 (May)
Salu Digby in Action Comics #276 (May)
Phantom Girl in Action Comics #276 (May)
Sun Boy in Action Comics #276 (May)
Bouncing Boy in Action Comics #276 (May)
Lena Luthor in Superman's Girl Friend Lois Lane #23 (February)
Saturn Queen in Superman #147 (August)
Lightning Lord in Superman #147 (August)
Cosmic King in Superman #147 (August)
Super-Chief in All-Star Western #117 (March)
Kanjar Ro in Justice League of America #03 (February)
Dev-Em in Adventure Comics #287 (August)

Other publishers 

Jubal Pomp (February) - Disney
Zagor, in The forest of the ambushes (June) - Bonelli 
Cico, Mexican friend and comic sidekick of Zagor,  in The forest of ambushes (June) - Bonelli
Ludwig von Drake (September) - Disney
John Davison Rockerduck (December) - Disney
Magica de Spell (December) – Disney

References